James Berry may refer to:

Entertainment
 James Berry (artist) (1906–1979), New Zealand artist, stamp and coin designer
 James Berry (poet) (1924–2017), Jamaican poet
 James Berry (writer) (1842–1914), Irish writer
 Jim Berry (cartoonist) (1932–2015), American comic strip artist

Politics
 James Berry (barrister) (born 1983), British Conservative Party politician, MP for Kingston and Surbiton 2015–2017
 James E. Berry (1881–1966), longest-serving Lieutenant Governor in Oklahoma
 James Henderson Berry (1841–1913), Governor and U.S. Senator of Arkansas

Sports
 James Berry (footballer) (born 2000), English footballer
 Jim Berry (soccer) (born 1945), Canadian soccer player
 Jim Berry (hurler) (born 1989), Wexford hurler

Other
 James Berry (major-general) (died 1691), Parliamentary major-general who fought in the English Civil War
 James Berry (executioner) (1852–1913), English executioner, 1884–1891
 James Berry (surgeon) (1860–1946), British surgeon
 Jim Berry, president of the United States Chess Federation
 Jim Berry (news anchor) (born c. 1955), Miami news anchor
 James Gomer Berry, 1st Viscount Kemsley (1883–1968), Welsh publisher
 James Berry, Puritan leader of Seat Pleasant, Maryland

See also
Berry (disambiguation)
 Berry baronets
Richard James Arthur Berry (1867–1962), British surgeon and professor of anatomy in Australia